George Sykes (1822–1880) was an American Civil War major general in the Union Army. 

George Sykes may also refer to:
George Sykes (footballer) (born 1994), English/Scottish footballer
George Sykes (New Hampshire politician) (born 1951), member of the New Hampshire House of Representatives
George Sykes (New Jersey politician) (1802–1880), U.S. Representative from New Jersey
George Sykes (New Zealand politician) (1867–1957),New Zealand Member of Parliament
George Sykes (Wisconsin politician) (1816–1881), member of the Wisconsin State Assembly

See also
Sykes (disambiguation)